Rose City Comic Con (RCCC) is an annual comic book and pop culture convention that takes place in Portland, Oregon each September.

Was founded by Ron Brister and his partner Paula Brister while on a road trip to San Diego Comic-Con (SDCC) in July 2011. The founders decided that Portland, Oregon was missing an event that would captivate Portlanders with the same charm as San Diego and the northwest's favorite event, Emerald City Comic Con. From that road trip, much discussion, and a budget of less than $20,000 - Ron and Paula Brister officially launched Rose City Comic Con in late summer of 2011 with the first event scheduled to run the following year in October 2012. However, after further research the event was quickly rescheduled to September in order to not be in between Baltimore and New York Comic Con (NYCC) that first year. The first official announcement of Rose City Comic Con took place at Jet City Comic Show. 

The show organizers knew the show just needed to break even in order for it to be a success. The show organizers hoped for 750 attendees but quickly realized the day before the first show, they would exceed that number. The bigger problem was where to hold it the second year.

The first convention in 2012 was held at the DoubleTree hotel near the Lloyd Center.

The second annual event, held in 2013, was co-produced, co-funded and co-organized by Emerald City Comic-Con, the largest comic book convention in the Pacific Northwest that saw significant expansion in the years prior. This transition moved RCCC to the Oregon Convention Center and took up halls A1, B, and C, totaling more than 120,000 square feet, and saw a 405% increase in attendance. Since 2013, Emerald City Comic-Con and Rose City Comic-Con have been a Pacific Northwest partnership stationed in its two biggest cities: Seattle and Portland.

In February 2017, the founders and partners agreed to sell a majority stake ownership to LeftField media which had been founded by the former executive within ReedPop!. The two founders stayed on with the business while the partners from Emerald City Comic Con separated. Both Ron and Paula Brister stayed with the company until Paula departed just before the covid pandemic in 2020. Ron stayed on in a consulting roll only until early 2021. 

The 2020 edition of the convention was cancelled due to the COVID-19 pandemic.

Dates and locations

References

Comics conventions in the United States
2011 establishments in Oregon
Conventions in Oregon
Annual events in Portland, Oregon